Merle Hollis (22 May 1915 – 31 August 1980) was a New Zealand cricketer who played primarily as a right-arm medium bowler. She played in one Test match for New Zealand, their first, in 1935. This was the only official match she ever played.

References

External links
 
 

1915 births
1980 deaths
Cricketers from Dunedin
New Zealand women cricketers
New Zealand women Test cricketers